Elisabeth Fraser (born Elisabeth Fraser Jonker, January 8, 1920 – May 5, 2005) was an American actress, best known for playing brassy blondes.

Life and career
Born Elisabeth Fraser Jonker on January 8, 1920, in Brooklyn, New York, she was educated in Haiti, France and New York.

Fraser began her acting career six weeks after graduating from high school; she was cast as the ingenue in the Broadway production of There Shall Be No Night, which won the Pulitzer Prize for the 1940-1941 season. Fraser obtained a contract with Warner Brothers studios. She appeared in dozens of films.

One of her first roles was in The Man Who Came to Dinner as June Stanley, the young daughter of the Ohio couple forced to put up with Monty Woolley, who tells her to follow her heart to the man she loves, a trade unionist in her father's company, regardless of her father's feelings. She also appeared in All My Sons, Roseanna McCoy, and So Big.

Her most notable role was as Shelley Winters' character's friend in the 1965 hit film A Patch of Blue. She also played in the movie Ask Any Girl as Jeannie with Shirley MacLaine.  Fraser's stage career spanned over three decades and included Broadway productions of The Best Man, The Family, and Tunnel of Love (she also appeared in the 1958 film version).

Television
She played Hazel Norris on the television version of Fibber McGee and Molly, Frances Warner in McKeever and the Colonel, Josie Ryan in Off We Go, Mildred Hogan in One Happy Family, and Sgt. Bilko's longtime girlfriend, Joan, on The Phil Silvers Show. She also guest-starred on many popular television series, including three guest appearances on Perry Mason, such as the role of Estelle Paige in the 1966 episode, "The Case of the Sausalito Sunrise." She also made four appearances on Maude.

In 1966, she appeared in James Arness’s TV Western series Gunsmoke, playing “Daisy Lou” in S11E26’s “”Which Doctor?”.

Book
Fraser wrote a book, Once Upon a Dime. Newspaper columnist Terry Vernon described the book as "a humorous account of what happens to a divorced actress with three children who arrives in Hollywood."

Death
On May 5, 2005, Fraser died of congestive heart failure in Woodland Hills, California, at the age of 85. She was cremated and her ashes scattered at sea.

Personal life
Fraser was married to Ray McDonald from 1944 to 1952. The marriage ended in divorce. She later married Charles K. Peck Jr. but the marriage also ended in divorce. Fraser and McDonald had three children.

Filmography

References

External links
 
 
 
 Elisabeth Fraser papers, 1920-1999, held by the Billy Rose Theatre Division, New York Public Library for the Performing Arts

1920 births
2005 deaths
Actresses from New York City
American film actresses
American television actresses
People from Brooklyn
People from Greater Los Angeles
American expatriates in Haiti
American expatriates in France
20th-century American actresses
21st-century American women